Louis Verboven (21 February 1909 – 14 March 1967) was a Belgian footballer. He played in two matches for the Belgium national football team from 1931 to 1933.

References

External links
 

1909 births
1967 deaths
Belgian footballers
Belgium international footballers
Place of birth missing
Association footballers not categorized by position